Żaby may refer to:

Żaby, Łódź Voivodeship, Poland
Żaby, Masovian Voivodeship, Poland